RPFC may refer to:

 Railway Protection Force commandos
 Reigate Priory F.C.  
 Right dorsolateral prefrontal cortex  
 Rosslyn Park F.C.
Roxburgh Park Football Club
 Royal Patriotic Fund Corporation